Lokanath Misra (22 November 1921 - 27 May 2009) was an Indian politician. He was a member of the Rajya Sabha.
He was the Governor of Assam from 1991 to 1997
and held additional charge as Governor of Nagaland from 1992 to 1993.
He died on 27 May 2009 at Bhubaneswar.
He was the elder son of poet and notable socialist Godabarish Mishra. His younger brother, Ranganath Misra was the former Chief Justice of India while his son, Pinaki Misra is a member of the 11th, 15th and 16th Lok Sabha representing Puri constituency.

References

1921 births
2009 deaths
People from Odisha
Odisha politicians
Rajya Sabha members from Odisha
Governors of Assam
Governors of Nagaland
Governors of Arunachal Pradesh
Swatantra Party politicians
Janata Party politicians